Jacqueline Coutras, born in 1942, is a French geographer, CNRS researcher, and pioneer of gender geography in France.

Along with Jeanne Fagnani, she took part in the institutionalization of international feminist geography.

In her 1996 book, (Urban crisis and gendered spaces), she addresses the issue of sexual spatial asymmetries, and shows that if women have expanded the space to which they were traditionally confined through access to paid work and car driving, they nevertheless were not able to achieve full access to all spaces of socialization. Cities remain unequal spaces.

Biography 
Jacqueline Coutras is a pioneer in gender geography and "an important reference for all feminist geographers". She is a CNRS researcher at the Institut de recherche sur les sociétés contemporaines (Iresco). She also holdthe the French academic title  «agrégée in geography».

She defended her post-graduate thesis in 1975 under the direction of Jacqueline Beaujeu-Garnier, on "economic activity zones and development in the western part of the Paris region ".

Work in the field of feminist geography 
Coutras published feminist studies on women, their urban practices and spatial behaviors as soon as the end of the 1970s.

Feminist geography 
Coutras attempted to found a feminist geography along with Jeanne Fagnani while still remaining in the social geography field. Together they make «women» a research category in the academic setting. They intervened in the academic journal , an emblematic place of the european feminist research until it disappeared in 1982. Their approaches are marked by a feminist and marxist discourse.

Her pioneering work in feminist geography was contested by some emblematic researchers of French social geography, but later paved the way for a feminist geography.

During the national colloquium "Women, Feminism and Research", which brought together nearly a hundred people in Toulouse in December 1982, Coutras moderated and synthesized a debate entitled "Women and Spaces". In 1982 she also intervened at the colloquium of Lyon of social geography, on the issue of  "the city from a  feminine perspective" during a session titled "the behavior of the social groups".

With Jeanne Fagnani, she took part in the institutionalization of international feminist geography by participating in the "round table" on "women in geography" organized and moderated by Janice Monk and Maria Dolors García Ramón, during the regional conference on Mediterranean countries held in Barcelona in September 1986.

Crise urbaine et espaces sexués 
In her 1996 book Crise urbaine et espaces sexués, she took advantage of the urban crisis in France to explore the question of sexual spatial asymmetries. She explained that, thanks to paid work and access to driving women had pushed back the limits of the spaces traditionally devoted to  them in residential space to conquer the functional city, without however managing to access the socializing city. City spaces remain unequal, and public policies privileges the needs of men.

In her critical review of the book, Nicole Brais summarized it by mentioning that :The city of intersubjectivity is one of encounters, of chance, of adventure, of strolling. This presupposes a feeling of security in the "other", a certain form of anonymity. It is in the conjunction of these two elements, security and anonymity, that we can explain that the flâneurs are not flâneuses. Women do not experience, in the public space, the security necessary to be available and disposed to meeting, to the unusual. Because of the lack of a specific field of gender or feminist geography in France, her work was subsequently forgotten. She explained in 1999 that :Perhaps we should have sought to create a "feminist geography" like our Anglo-Saxon and Quebecois colleagues. This has not been the case. This attitude has been typically French, and other disciplines have applied it as well. It was adopted out of fear of ghettoization.

Publications

Ouvrages

 
 
 
.

Articles 
 
.
.
.
.
.

Notes and references

Bibliography

References

Living people
French geographers
Women geographers
French feminists
1942 births